Friedrich Wilhelm Meuring (June 6, 1882 in Amsterdam – May 28, 1973 in Haarlem) was a Dutch freestyle swimmer who competed in the 1908 Summer Olympics. He participated in the 400 metre freestyle competition, but he was eliminated in the first round.

References

1882 births
1973 deaths
Dutch male freestyle swimmers
Swimmers at the 1908 Summer Olympics
Olympic swimmers of the Netherlands
Swimmers from Amsterdam
20th-century Dutch people